Haley Joelle Intile-Epstein (born October 5, 1999), also known as Haley Joelle, is an American songwriter and singer who started getting recognition on TikTok in late 2020 for her unreleased original songs.

Joelle’s song "Emergency Contact" was released on March 4, 2021 as her first official release, after a TikTok of the song inspired by the TV show The Bachelor went viral, amassing over 2.6 million views.

In 2018-2019, Joelle attended the first year of LIMPI, a pop music school backed by Stargate, Magnus Beite, Amund Bjørklund of Espionage, and Lars Hustoft, where she worked with and was mentored by the likes of Tor Erik, Emily Warren, Axident, Martin Sjølie, Fred Ball, and other household names in the music industry.

She also had early success as a teenager, when she topped the Billboard Dance Club Songs chart in its 17 February 2018 issue with "Meet in the Middle", a song by Swedish DJ Stonebridge that she co-wrote at the age of 16.

References 

1999 births
Living people
American dance musicians
American women pop singers
American women singer-songwriters
21st-century American women singers
21st-century American singers
American singer-songwriters